The 2021–22 season is SC Dnipro-1's 5th season in existence and the club's 3rd consecutive season in the top flight of Ukrainian football. In addition to the domestic league, SC Dnipro-1 participated in the season's edition of the Ukrainian Cup. The season covered the period from 1 July, 2021 to 30 June, 2022.

Season events
On 11 June 2021, Valeriy Luchkevych was signed on a free transfer from Oleksandriya, with the player joining Dnipro-1 on 1 July once his previous contract expires.

On 24 June 2021, Neven Đurasek was signed on a one-year loan deal from Dinamo Zagreb, with the player joining the club on 1 July once the summer transfer window opens.

On 25 June 2021, Oleksandr Pikhalyonok, who played the previous year on loan from Shakhtar Donetsk, signed a 4-year contract with the team from Dnipro, with the transfer being valued at €700,000.

On 25 June 2021, Andriy Tsurikov signed on a free transfer for Metalist Kharkiv, with the player joining the new club on 1 July after his contract expired.

On 30 June 2021, Nazariy Rusyn was signed on a one-year loan deal from Dynamo Kyiv, with the player joining the club on 1 July once the summer transfer window opens.

On 30 June 2021, four players left the club after their contracts expired. Oleksandr Safronov joined Desna Chernihiv, Zauri Makharadze joined Polissya Zhytomyr, Douglas joined Giresunspor, and Lucas Taylor joined PAOK.

On 1 July 2021, Bohdan Sarnavskyi was loaned out to Kryvbas Kryvyi Rih on a one-year long deal.

On 2 July 2021, Vagner Gonçalves was loaned out to Kryvbas Kryvyi Rih on a one-year long deal.

On 5 July 2021, Valentin Cojocaru was signed for €100,000 from Viitorul Constanța, with the Romanian goalkeeper signing a 2-year contract. On the same day, Yevhen Past was signed on a free transfer after his contract with Desna Chernihiv expired, with the player signing a 2-year contract.

On 12 July 2021, Mykyta Kravchenko was signed on a one-year loan deal from Dynamo Kyiv.

On 19 July 2021, Mario Ćuže, who played for Dnipro-1 in the second part of the previous season on loan from Dinamo Zagreb, signed another 1-year loan deal with the team.

On 21 July 2021, Dnipro-1 announced that a contract was signed with Parimatch who will be their main sponsor. For the first time in its 4-year history Dnipro-1 will have the logo of a sponsor shown in the front of the shirt. On the same day, the club presented its new kit for the season. The home kit is navy blue with blue sleeves. The away kit is school bus yellow. Goalkeeper kits are green, yellow, and sky blue.

On 23 July 2021, Oleksandr Byelyayev was loaned out to Gençlerbirliği on a one-year long deal.

On 28 July 2021, Vladyslav Dubinchak, who played for Dnipro-1 the previous season on loan from Dynamo Kyiv, signed another 1-year loan deal with the team.

On 15 August 2021, Oleksiy Hutsulyak was signed for €500,000 from Desna Chernihiv, with the Ukrainian midfielder signing a 4-year contract.

On 2 September 2021, Nélson Monte was signed on a free transfer from Rio Ave, with the Portuguese centre-back signing a 2-year contract with Dnipro-1.

On 27 December 2021, Dnipro-1 announced that Arseniy Batahov will be loaned out to Ukrainian First League club Polissya Zhytomyr until the end of the season.

On 30 December 2021, Bill, who played the second part of the previous season and the first half of the current season on loan from Flamengo, signed a 5-year contract with the team from Dnipro, with the transfer being valued at €300,000.

On 3 January 2022, Vladyslav Dubinchak, the usual left-back defender during the first half of the season, was returned from loan by Dynamo Kyiv after selling its main left-back Vitaliy Mykolenko to Everton.

Squad

Transfers

In

Summer

Winter

Loans in

Summer

Winter

Out

Summer

Winter

Loans out

Summer

Winter

Loans ended

Winter

Released

Summer

Overall transfer activity

Expenditure
Summer:  €1,300,000

Winter:  €300,000

Total:  €1,600,000

Income
Summer:  €0

Winter:  €300,000

Total:  €300,000

Net totals
Summer:  €1,300,000

Winter:  €0

Total:  €1,300,000

Friendlies

Competitions

Overall record

Ukrainian Premier League

League table

Results summary

Results by round

Results

Ukrainian Cup

Squad statistics

Appearances and goals

Goalscorers

Clean sheets

Disciplinary record

References

External links 
Official website

SC Dnipro-1
SC Dnipro-1 seasons